Below a list of all national champions in the Men's Discus Throw event in track and field from several countries since 1980.

Australia

1980: Phil Nettle
1981: Phil Nettle
1982: Vlad Slavnic
1983: Paul Nandapi
1984: Paul Nandapi
1985: Paul Nandapi
1986: Paul Nandapi
1987: Paul Nandapi
1988: Werner Reiterer
1989: Werner Reiterer
1990: Werner Reiterer
1991: Werner Reiterer
1992: Werner Reiterer
1993: Werner Reiterer
1994: Werner Reiterer
1995: Werner Reiterer
1996: Justin Anlezark
1997: Gerard Duffy
1998: Ian Winchester (NZL) 
1999: Gerard Duffy
2000: Ian Winchester (NZL) 
2001: Aaron Neighbour
2002: Peter Elvy
2003: Peter Elvy
2004: Scott Martin
2005: Scott Martin
2006: Scott Martin
2007: Benn Harradine
2008: Benn Harradine
2009: Bertrand Vili (FRA)

Belgium

1970: Jos Schroeder
1971: Jos Schroeder
1972: Jos Schroeder
1973: Jos Schroeder
1974: Jos Schroeder
1975: Robert Van Schoor
1976: Jos Schroeder
1977: Jos Schroeder
1978: Jos Schroeder
1979: Jos Schroeder
1980: Jos Schroeder
1981: Jos Schroeder
1982: Robert Van Schoor
1983: Jos Schroeder
1984: Robert Van Schoor
1985: Jos Schroeder
1986: Robert Van Schoor
1987: Jos Schroeder
1988: Jordy Beernaert
1989: Jordy Beernaert
1990: Jo Van Daele 
1991: Herman Van Uytven 
1992: Jordy Beernaert 
1993: Jo Van Daele
1994: Jo Van Daele
1995: Jo Van Daele
1996: Jo Van Daele
1997: Jo Van Daele
1998: Jo Van Daele
1999: Jo Van Daele
2000: Jo Van Daele
2001: Kris Coene
2002: Jo Van Daele
2003: Jo Van Daele
2004: Jo Van Daele
2005: Jo Van Daele
2006: Milosz Tomarek
2007: Wim Blondeel
2008: Kris Coene
2009: Wim Blondeel
2010: Wim Blondeel
2011: Philip Milanov
2012: Philip Milanov
2013: Philip Milanov
2014: Philip Milanov

Bulgaria

1980: Emil Vladimirov
1981: Emil Vladimirov
1982: Velislav Prokhaska
1983: Velko Velev
1984: Velko Velev
1985: Georgi Georgiev
1986: Kamen Dimitrov
1987: Kamen Dimitrov
1988: Georgi Georgiev
1989: Georgi Georgiev
1990: Nikolai Kolev
1991: Georgi Georgiev
1992: Nikolai Kolev
1993: Kamen Dimitrov
1994: Ilian Iliev
1995: Ilian Iliev
1996: Ilian Iliev
1997: Kiril Angelov
1998: Ilian Manolov
1999: Miroslav Kostov
2000: Encho Shterev
2001: Ivan Stanev
2002: Encho Shterev
2003: Encho Shterev
2004: Encho Shterev
2005: Encho Shterev
2006: Encho Shterev

Canada

1980: Borys Chambul
1981: Jack Harkness
1982: Borys Chambul
1983: Rob Gray
1984: Rob Gray
1985: Rob Gray
1986: Rob Gray
1987: Ray Lazdins
1988: Ray Lazdins
1989: Ray Lazdins
1990: Ray Lazdins
1991: Ray Lazdins
1992: Ray Lazdins
1993: Ray Lazdins
1994: Ray Lazdins
1995: Jason Tunks
1996: Jason Tunks
1997: Jason Tunks
1998: Jason Tunks
1999: Jason Tunks
2000: Jason Tunks
2001: Jason Tunks
2002: Jason Tunks
2003: Jason Tunks
2004: Jason Tunks
2005: Jason Tunks
2006: Dariusz Slownik
2007: Jason Tunks
2008: Jason Tunks
2009: Jason Tunks
2010: Mike Ransky
2011: Brent Roubos
2012: Timothy Nedow

Denmark

1980: Kjeld Andresen
1981: Kjeld Andresen
1982: Kjeld Andresen
1983: Claus Bahrt
1984: Peder Jarl Hansen
1985: Peder Jarl Hansen
1986: Kjeld Andresen
1987: Allan Laursen
1988: Allan Laursen
1989: Claus Lynggård
1990: Claus Lynggård
1991: Jan Cordius
1992: Jan Cordius
1993: Allan Laursen
1994: Brian Møller
1995: Jan Cordius
1996: Brian Møller
1997: Jan Cordius
1998: Dariusz Slowik
1999: Joachim Olsen
2000: Joachim Olsen
2001: Joachim Olsen
2002: Joachim Olsen
2003: Joachim Olsen
2004: Martin Roald
2005: Michael Johansen
2006: Peter Berling
2007: Joachim Olsen

Estonia

1917*: Aleksander Klumberg
1918*: Aleksander Klumberg
1919*: Harald Tammer
1920: Harald Tammer
1921: Harald Tammer
1922: Aleksander Klumberg
1923: Aleksander Klumberg
1924: Gustav Kalkun
1925: Gustav Kalkun
1926: Aleksander Klumberg
1927: Mihkal Liinat
1928: Gustav Kalkun
1929: Nikolai Feldmann
1930: Nikolai Feldmann
1931: Nikolai Feldmann
1932: Nikolai Feldmann
1933: Arnold Viiding
1934: Arnold Viiding
1935: Arnold Viiding
1936: Oskar Erikson
1937: Oskar Erikson
1938: Oskar Erikson
1939: Paul Määrits
1940: Oskar Linnaste
1941: -
1942: Oskar Linnaste
1943: Aleksander Kreek
1944: Elmar Lilienthal
1945: Aadu Tarmak
1946: Aadu Tarmak
1947: Arvo Putmaker
1948: Heino Lipp
1949: Heino Lipp
1950: Dimitri Prants
1951: Heino Lipp
1952: Heino Lipp
1953: Heino Lipp
1954: Heino Lipp
1955: Heino Apart
1956: Heino Heinaste
1957: Heino Apart
1958: Kaupo Metsur
1959: Kaupo Metsur
1960: Kaupo Metsur
1961: Enn Erikson
1962: Kaupo Metsur
1963: Kaupo Metsur
1964: Kaupo Metsur
1965: Kaupo Metsur
1966: Kaupo Metsur
1967: Kaupo Metsur
1968: Kaupo Metsur
1969: Enn Erikson
1970: Veljo Kuusemäe
1971: Enn Erikson
1972: Enn Erikson
1973: Enn Erikson
1974: Veljo Kuusemäe
1975: Enn Erikson
1976: Veljo Kuusemäe
1977: Veljo Kuusemäe
1978: Veljo Kuusemäe
1979: Kalev Külv
1980: Kalev Külv
1981: Kalev Külv
1982: Kalev Külv
1983: Kalev Külv
1984: Kalev Külv
1985: Kalev Külv
1986: Kalev Külv
1987: Kalev Külv
1988: Kalev Külv
1989: Kalev Külv
1990: Ants Kiisa
1991: Valter Külvet
1992: Ants Kiisa
1993: Aleksander Tammert
1994: Aleksander Tammert
1995: Aleksander Tammert
1996: Ants Kiisa
1997: Aleksander Tammert
1998: Aleksander Tammert
1999: Aleksander Tammert
2000: Aleksander Tammert
2001: Aleksander Tammert
2002: Aleksander Tammert
2003: Aleksander Tammert
2004: Gerd Kanter
2005: Gerd Kanter
2006: Gerd Kanter
2007: Gerd Kanter
2008: Gerd Kanter
2009: Gerd Kanter
2010: Aleksander Tammert
2011: Gerd Kanter
2012: Gerd Kanter
2013: Gerd Kanter
2014: Gerd Kanter
2015: Gerd Kanter
2016: Martin Kupper
2017: Martin Kupper
2018: Gerd Kanter
2019: Gerd Kanter
2020: Martin Kupper
2021: Martin Kupper
2022: Kevin Sakson

* unofficial championships

Finland

1980: Markku Tuokko
1981: Markku Tuokko
1982: Markku Tuokko
1983: Ari Huumonen
1984: Juhani Tuomola
1985: Ari Huumonen
1986: Raimo Vento
1987: Ari Huumonen
1988: Mika Muukka
1989: Raimo Vento
1990: Mika Muukka
1991: Heikki Hollmén
1992: Heikki Hollmén
1993: Martti Halmesmäki
1994: Harri Uurainen
1995: Harri Uurainen
1996: Timo Sinervo
1997: Harri Uurainen
1998: Timo Tompuri
1999: Pertti Hynni
2000: Timo Tompuri
2001: Timo Tompuri
2002: Mika Loikkanen
2003: Timo Tompuri
2004: Pertti Hynni
2005: Timo Tompuri
2006: Mikko Kyyrö
2007: Frantz Kruger
2008: Frantz Kruger
2009: Mikko Kyyrö
2010: Frantz Kruger
2011: Mikko Kyyrö

Germany

East Germany

1980: Wolfgang Schmidt
1981: Armin Lemme
1982: Armin Lemme
1983: Jürgen Schult
1984: Jürgen Schult
1985: Jürgen Schult
1986: Jürgen Schult
1987: Jürgen Schult
1988: Jürgen Schult
1989: Jürgen Schult
1990: Jürgen Schult

West Germany

1980: Rolf Danneberg
1981: Alwin Wagner
1982: Alwin Wagner
1983: Alwin Wagner
1984: Alwin Wagner
1985: Alwin Wagner
1986: Alois Hannecker
1987: Alois Hannecker
1988: Rolf Danneberg
1989: Rolf Danneberg
1990: Wolfgang Schmidt

Unified Germany

1991: Wolfgang Schmidt
1992: Lars Riedel
1993: Lars Riedel
1994: Lars Riedel
1995: Lars Riedel
1996: Lars Riedel
1997: Lars Riedel
1998: Lars Riedel
1999: Jürgen Schult
2000: Lars Riedel
2001: Lars Riedel
2002: Michael Möllenbeck
2003: Lars Riedel
2004: Michael Möllenbeck
2005: Michael Möllenbeck
2006: Lars Riedel
2007: Robert Harting
2008: Robert Harting
2009: Robert Harting
2010: Robert Harting
2011: Robert Harting
2012: Robert Harting
2013: Robert Harting
2014: Robert Harting
2015: Christoph Harting

Great Britain

1980: Brian Oldfield (USA)
1981: John Powell (USA)
1982: Brad Cooper (BAH)
1983: Robert Weir
1984: Robert Weir
1985: Juan Martínez (CUB)
1986: Richard Slaney
1987: Paul Mardle
1988: Paul Mardle
1989: Paul Mardle
1990: Abi Ekoku
1991: Werner Reiterer (AUS)
1992: Werner Reiterer (AUS)
1993: Robert Weir
1994: Kevin Brown
1995: Nick Sweeney (IRL)
1996: Robert Weir
1997: Robert Weir
1998: Robert Weir
1999: Robert Weir
2000: Robert Weir
2001: Glen Smith
2002: Robert Weir
2003: Emeka Udechuku
2004: Emeka Udechuku
2005: Carl Myerscough
2006: Carl Myerscough
2007: Emeka Udechuku
2011: Lawrence Okoye

Hungary

1980: Ferenc Szegletes
1981: Ferenc Szegletes
1982: Ferenc Csiszár
1983: Ferenc Csiszár
1984: Ferenc Tégla
1985: Csaba Holló
1986: Csaba Holló
1987: Attila Horváth
1988: József Ficsor
1989: József Ficsor
1990: Attila Horváth
1991: Attila Horváth
1992: Attila Horváth
1993: Attila Horváth
1994: Attila Horváth
1995: Attila Horváth
1996: Attila Horváth
1997: Attila Horváth
1998: Róbert Fazekas
1999: Roland Varga
2000: Róbert Fazekas
2001: Zoltán Kővágó
2002: Róbert Fazekas
2003: Róbert Fazekas
2004: Zoltán Kővágó
2005: Zoltán Kővágó
2006: Roland Varga

Italy

1980: Armando De Vincentis
1981: Armando De Vincentis
1982: Marco Bucci
1983: Marco Martino
1984: Marco Bucci
1985: Domenico Polato
1986: Marco Martino
1987: Marco Martino
1988: Marco Martino
1989: Luciano Zerbini
1990: Marco Martino
1991: Marco Martino
1992: Luciano Zerbini
1993: Luciano Zerbini
1994: Diego Fortuna
1995: Diego Fortuna
1996: Alessandro Urlando
1997: Diego Fortuna
1998: Diego Fortuna
1999: Diego Fortuna
2000: Diego Fortuna
2001: Diego Fortuna
2002: Cristiano Andrei
2003: Cristiano Andrei
2004: Diego Fortuna
2005: Hannes Kirchler
2006: Hannes Kirchler
2007: Hannes Kirchler
2008: Hannes Kirchler
2009: Hannes Kirchler
2010: Hannes Kirchler

Latvia

2008: Oskars Siļčenoks
2009: Oskars Vaisjūns
2010: Oskars Vaisjūns

Netherlands

1980: Jan Diender
1981: Erik de Bruin
1982: Erik de Bruin
1983: Erik de Bruin
1984: Erik de Bruin
1985: Erik de Bruin
1986: Erik de Bruin
1987: Erik de Bruin
1988: Erik de Bruin
1989: Erik de Bruin
1990: Erik de Bruin
1991: Erik de Bruin
1992: Erik de Bruin
1993: Erik de Bruin
1994: Ben Vet
1995: Ben Vet
1996: Ben Vet
1997: Pieter van der Kruk Jr.
1998: Mike van der Bilt
1999: Mike van der Bilt
2000: Pieter van der Kruk Jr.
2001: Pieter van der Kruk Jr.
2002: Rutger Smith
2003: Rutger Smith
2004: Rutger Smith
2005: Rutger Smith
2006: Rutger Smith
2007: Rutger Smith
2008: Rutger Smith
2009: Boudewijn Luijten
2010: Erik Cadée
2011: Rutger Smith
2012: Erik Cadée
2013: Erik Cadée
2014: Erik Cadée
2015: Rutger Smith

Poland

1980: Stanisław Wołodko
1981: Stanisław Wołodko
1982: Dariusz Juzyszyn
1983: Dariusz Juzyszyn
1984: Stanisław Grabowski
1985: Dariusz Juzyszyn
1986: Dariusz Juzyszyn
1987: Dariusz Juzyszyn
1988: Dariusz Juzyszyn
1989: Dariusz Juzyszyn
1990: Jacek Strychalski
1991: Jacek Strychalski
1992: Marek Majkrzak
1993: Marek Stolarczyk
1994: Marek Majkrzak
1995: Dariusz Juzyszyn
1996: Andrzej Krawczyk
1997: Andrzej Krawczyk
1998: Andrzej Krawczyk
1999: Olgierd Stański
2000: Olgierd Stański
2001: Olgierd Stański
2002: Andrzej Krawczyk
2003: Andrzej Krawczyk
2004: Andrzej Krawczyk
2005: Piotr Małachowski
2006: Piotr Małachowski
2007: Piotr Małachowski
2008: Piotr Małachowski
2009: Piotr Małachowski
2010: Piotr Małachowski
2011: Przemysław Czajkowski
2012: Piotr Małachowski
2013: Piotr Małachowski
2014: Piotr Małachowski
2015: Piotr Małachowski
2016: Piotr Małachowski
2017: Robert Urbanek
2018: Piotr Małachowski
2019: Bartłomiej Stój

Portugal

1980: Carlos Sustelo
1981: Carlos Sustelo
1982: Manuel Pinto
1983: Jorge Grave
1984: Paulo Santos
1985: Paulo Santos
1986: Paulo Santos
1987: Paulo Santos
1988: Paulo Santos
1989: Fernando Alves
1990: Paulo Santos
1991: Fernando Alves
1992: Fernando Alves
1993: Fernando Alves
1994: Paulo Santos
1995: Paulo Bernardo
1996: Fernando Alves
1997: Paulo Bernardo
1998: Paulo Bernardo
1999: Fernando Alves
2000: Paulo Bernardo
2001: Paulo Bernardo
2002: Paulo Bernardo
2003: Paulo Bernardo
2004: Paulo Bernardo
2005: Paulo Bernardo
2006: Jorge Grave
2007: Jorge Grave
2008: Jorge Grave
2009: Marco Fortes
2010: Jorge Grave
2011: Marco Fortes
2012: Jorge Grave

Russia

1992: Dmitriy Shevchenko
1993: Dmitriy Shevchenko
1994: Sergey Lyakhov
1995: Sergey Lyakhov
1996: Yuriy Seskin
1997: Aleksandr Borichevskiy
1998: Aleksandr Borichevskiy
1999: Dmitriy Shevchenko
2000: Dmitriy Shevchenko
2001: Dmitriy Shevchenko
2002: Ilya Kostin
2003: Dmitriy Shevchenko
2004: Aleksandr Borichevskiy
2005: Bogdan Pishchalnikov
2006: Stanislav Alekseyev

South Africa

1980: Izak Kotze
1981: Piet Goosen
1982: Piet Goosen
1983: Izak Kotze
1984: Izak Kotze
1985: John van Reenen
1986: John van Reenen
1987: John van Reenen
1988: George Tossel
1989: George Tossel
1990: Dawie Kok
1991: Dawie Kok
1992: Dawie Kok
1993: Christo Kruger
1994: Frits Potgieter
1995: Frits Potgieter
1996: Frantz Kruger
1997: Frits Potgieter
1998: Frits Potgieter
1999: Frantz Kruger
2000: Frantz Kruger
2001: Frantz Kruger
2002: Frantz Kruger
2003: Frantz Kruger
2004: Frantz Kruger
2005: Frantz Kruger
2006: Hannes Hopley

Spain

1980: Sinesio Garrachón
1981: Sinesio Garrachón
1982: Sinesio Garrachón
1983: Sinesio Garrachón
1984: Sinesio Garrachón
1985: Sinesio Garrachón
1986: Sinesio Garrachón
1987: David Martínez
1988: David Martínez
1989: David Martínez
1990: David Martínez
1991: David Martínez
1992: David Martínez
1993: José Luis Valencia
1994: David Martínez
1995: David Martínez
1996: David Martínez
1997: José Luis Valencia
1998: José Luis Valencia
1999: José Luis Valencia
2000: David Martínez
2001: Mario Pestano
2002: Mario Pestano
2003: Mario Pestano
2004: Mario Pestano
2005: Mario Pestano
2006: Mario Pestano
2007: Mario Pestano
2008: Mario Pestano
2009: Mario Pestano
2010: Mario Pestano
2011: Mario Pestano
2012: Mario Pestano

Sweden

1980: Kenth Gardenkrans
1981: Kenth Gardenkrans
1982: Göran Svensson
1983: Ricky Bruch
1984: Stefan Fernholm
1985: Lars Sundin
1986: Göran Bergqvist
1987: Lars Sundin
1988: Lars Sundin
1989: Stefan Fernholm
1990: Stefan Fernholm
1991: Stefan Fernholm
1992: Lars Sundin
1993: Dag Solhaug
1994: Kristian Pettersson
1995: Kristian Pettersson
1996: Kristian Pettersson
1997: Mattias Borrman
1998: Kristian Pettersson
1999: Mattias Borrman
2000: Mattias Borrman
2001: Kristian Pettersson
2002: Kristian Pettersson
2003: Mattias Borrman
2004: Niklas Arrhenius
2005: Staffan Jönsson
2006: Niklas Arrhenius
2007: Niklas Arrhenius
2008: Leif Arrhenius
2009: Per Rosell

Ukraine 

1992: Volodymyr Zinchenko
1993: Volodymyr Zinchenko
1994: Volodymyr Zinchenko
1995: Vitaliy Sidorov
1996: Vitaliy Sidorov
1997: Vitaliy Sidorov
1998: Vitaliy Sidorov
1999: Yuriy Bilonoh
2000: Kyrylo Chuprynin
2001: Yuriy Bilonoh
2002: 
2003: Yuriy Bilonog
2004: Kyrylo Chuprynin
2005: Kyrylo Chuprynin
2006: Serhiy Prughlo
2007: Stanislav Nesterovskyi
2008: Mykyta Nesterenko
2009: Oleksiy Semenov
2010: Ivan Hryshyn
2011: Ivan Hryshyn
2012: Mykyta Nesterenko
2013: Mykyta Nesterenko
2014: Oleksiy Semenov
2015: Mykyta Nesterenko
2016: Mykyta Nesterenko
2017: Ivan Panasyuk
2018: Mykyta Nesterenko
2019: Mykyta Nesterenko
2020: Mykyta Nesterenko

United States

1980: Mac Wilkins
1981: Ben Plucknett
1982: Luis Delís (CUB)
1983: John Powell
1984: John Powell
1985: John Powell
1986: John Powell
1987: John Powell
1988: Mac Wilkins
1989: Kamy Keshmiri
1990: Kamy Keshmiri
1991: Anthony Washington
1992: Kamy Keshmiri
1993: Anthony Washington
1994: Mike Gravelle
1995: Mike Buncic
1996: Anthony Washington
1997: John Godina
1998: John Godina
1999: Anthony Washington
2000: Adam Setliff
2001: Adam Setliff
2002: Adam Setliff
2003: Carl Brown
2004: Jarred Rome
2005: Ian Waltz
2006: Ian Waltz
2007: Michael Robertson
2008: Ian Waltz
2009: Casey Malone
2010: Casey Malone

References

GBRathletics

Men
National
Discus